Brstovnica is a settlement on the left bank of the Savinja River in the Municipality of Laško in eastern Slovenia. It was traditionally part of the Styria region and is now included with the rest of the municipality in the Savinja Statistical Region.

Archaeological evidence shows that the area has been settled since prehistoric and Roman times.

References

External links
Brstovnica on Geopedia

Populated places in the Municipality of Laško